Patricio Francisco Santamaría Mutis (born 5 November 1955) is a Chilean lawyer.

References

External links
 

1955 births
Living people
20th-century Chilean lawyers
21st-century Chilean lawyers
Pontifical Catholic University of Valparaíso alumni
Christian Democratic Party (Chile) politicians